Charles Dufraisse (20 August 1885, in Excideuil – 5 August 1969, in Excideuil) was a French chemist. With Charles Moureu, he conducted pioneer research of autoxidation and antioxidants.

In 1921 he received his doctorate at Paris with the thesis Contribution à l'étude de la stéréoisomérie éthylénique, and served as an associate director in the laboratory of organic chemistry at the Collège de France. In 1927 he was named a professor at the École supérieure de physique et de chimie industrielles de la Ville de Paris, and in 1942 became a professor at the Collège de France. He was cofounder of the Institut français du caoutchouc (French Institute of Rubber).

Selected writings 
 Contribution à l'étude de la stéréoisomérie éthylénique, (doctoral thesis, 1921).
 Méfaits et bienfaits de l'oxygène, 1930.
 L'oxydabilité considérée comme test d'état du caoutchouc, 1939.
 Applications de l'oxydabilité : Méthode manométrique : discussion, exemples (with Jean Le Bras, 1939).
 Le Caoutchouc, quelques aspects théoriques, 1942.
 L'état actuel du problème antioxygène, 1946.
 Writings by Dufraisse that have been published in English:
 "The ultra-rapid testing of rubber : the testing of its oxidizability in one quarter of an hour" (with Jean Le Bras).
 "The negative catalysis of auto-oxidation. Anti-oxygenic activity" (with Charles Moureu).
 "Catalysis and auto-oxidation. Anti-oxygenic and pro-oxygenic activity" (with Charles Moureu).
 "Messel memorial contribution the negative catalysis of auto oxidation. Anti-oxygenic activity" (with Charles Moureu).
 "Aging of rubber and its retardation by the surface application of antioxygens 1. Diffusion process" (with Charles Moureu, Pierre Lotte).

References 

1885 births
1969 deaths
People from Dordogne
20th-century French chemists
Academic staff of ESPCI Paris
Academic staff of the Collège de France